Tataouinea is an extinct genus of sauropod dinosaur in the subfamily Rebbachisaurinae of Rebbachisauridae which lived in the Early Cretaceous of Tunisia. Only one species, T. hannibalis, is known.

Discovery and naming 

The first known elements of the holotype were discovered in the Aïn el Guettar Formation in 2011 by Aldo Luigi Bacchetta, but he was unable to excavate the specimen until 2012. The remains were subsequently studied by Federico Fanti, Andrea Cau, Mohsen Hassine and Michela Contessi. The genus was named in 2013. The name refers to the Tataouine Governatorate, Tunisia, and Hannibal. In 2015 more material of the holotype specimen was uncovered after the initial description were analysed. These included additional tail vertebrae.

Description 

Its bones were extensively pneumatic, providing strong support for the theory that sauropods had birdlike respiratory systems. Key characteristics of its vertebral morphology show that Tatouinea was a rebbachisaurid, closely related to the nigersaurines of Europe. A phylogenetic analysis was published alongside the paper, finding a clade of nigersaurines to include Rebbachisaurus, thus forcing the subfamily to be renamed Rebbachisaurinae.

Etymology 
The genus name bears the name of the region where it was discovered, Tataouine, and the epithet honours Hannibal, a Carthaginian punic military commander.

Classification 
Tataouinea was placed in the Rebbachisaurinae by Fanti et al. (2015). The 2015 cladogram of Fanti et al. is shown below.

Paleoecology 
Tataouinea was discovered in the Jebel El Mra Member or the nearby Oum ed Diab Member of the Aptian-Albian Aïn el Guettar Formation. It coexisted with an unnamed carcharodontosaurid, Carcharodontosaurus, Spinosaurus, the notosuchian Araripesuchus, an unnamed sauropod, an unnamed iguanodont, an unnamed ornithocheirid pterosaur, an unnamed species of Sarcosuchus and a species of fish known as Mawsonia.

References 

Rebbachisaurids
Albian life
Early Cretaceous dinosaurs of Africa
Cretaceous Tunisia
Fossils of Tunisia
Fossil taxa described in 2013